Alan Barrett (1938 – 26 August 1991) was a British costume designer who was nominated at the 49th Academy Awards for Best Costumes for the film The Seven-Per-Cent Solution.

Filmography

Nijinsky (1980)
Yanks (1979)
The Seven-Per-Cent Solution (1976)
Royal Flash (1975)
Start the Revolution Without Me (1970)
Lock Up Your Daughters! (1969)
Far from the Madding Crowd (1967)

References

External links

British costume designers
1938 births
1991 deaths